Here's How may refer to: 
Here's How (TV series), a 1946 television series
Here's How, musical album by Bliss Blood
Here's Howe, a 1926 Broadway musical